Gram is the surname of:

 Andrea Gram (1853–1927), Norwegian painter
 Bjørn Arild Gram (born 1972), Norwegian politician and minister
 Elisabeth Gram (born 1996), Austrian freestyle skier
 Gregers Gram (1917–1944), Norwegian World War II soldier and resistance fighter
 Gregers Gram (1846–1929), Norwegian jurist, politician and international arbitrator
 Hans Christian Gram (1853–1938), Danish scientist who invented Gram staining
 Hans Gram (composer) (1754–1804), Danish-American musician
 Hans Gram (historian) (1685–1748), Danish academic
 Harald Gram (1887–1961), Norwegian jurist, politician and genealogist
 Jason Gram (born 1984), Australian rules footballer
 Jens Gram (1840–1912), Norwegian industrialist
 Jens Jensen Gram (1779–1824), Norwegian jurist and politician
 Johan Fredrik Gram (1868–1947), Norwegian chemist
 Jørgen Pedersen Gram (1850–1916), Danish mathematician and actuary
 Mads Gram (1875–1929), Norwegian physician
 Peder Gram (1881–1956), Danish composer and organist
 Victor Gram ((1910–1969), Danish politician 

Surnames from nicknames